50 Push Ups for a Dollar is a five-track extended play by Australian surf music and garage rock band Skegss, released on 16 October 2015. It provided two singles, "Fun" (July 2015) and "Eat It" (October). The EP's cover art was designed by Jack Irvine of Space 44. In March 2016 United States hip hop collaborators Reese x Lil Yachty released a single, "Do It". That single's cover art was described by Irvine, "they have just straight up taken the artwork, erased 'Skegss' and put their song title and not even changed anything else. And also, it's a horrible Photoshop edit looks like it was done in Microsoft Paint." The EP was re-released in October 2020 with the lead track from their 2014 single, "L. S. D.", added. It peaked at number 4 on the ARIA Albums Chart.

Background 

Skegss formed as a four-piece surf music and garage rock band in Byron Bay in early 2014. They released their debut single, "L. S. D." ( "Live Sleep Die"), in mid-year. Their founding guitarist, Noa Deane, left in the following year to focus on his surfing career. Skegss continued as a trio, Toby Cregan ( Toby Twostring) on bass guitar, Jonny Lani ( Jonny Layback) on drums and Ben Reed ( Ben Ben Bogroll) on lead vocals and guitar. They toured North America in mid-2015 and signed with Ratbag Records (see Dune Rats) upon returning to Australia. While they were in New York they recorded material at Converse Rubber Tracks.

The trio's first release for Ratbag Records was a single, "Fun", in July, which was distributed by Warner Music Australasia. They followed, in October, with its parent five-track extended play, 50 Push Ups for a Dollar, and a second single, "Eat It". The EP's cover art was designed by Jack Irvine of Space 44. In March 2016 United States hip hop collaborators Reese x Lil Yachty released a single, "Do It". Tone Deafs Tyler Jenke reported, "[they] seem to have had their artwork ripped off by an international artist." Irvine reflected, "they have just straight up taken the artwork, erased 'Skegss' and put their song title and not even changed anything else. And also, it's a horrible Photoshop edit looks like it was done in Microsoft Paint."

To mark the EP's fifth anniversary, Skegss issued a vinyl 12" six-track version on 1 October 2020, with "L. S. D." added. This version peaked at number 4 on the ARIA Albums Chart in November 2020. It was also the highest selling vinyl record for its first week.

Critical reception

The Musics Cara Oliveri rated 50 Push Ups for a Dollar at three-and-a-half stars out-of-five and stated, "brewing youthful stoner rock that doesn't take itself too seriously... [they] invite you to their epic house party full of rowdy tunes and good times."

Sosefina Fuamoli of The AU Review, felt that the EP was "everything we could've wanted from the trio. Fun, rollicking and generally down for anything, it's a mantra that has applied to [their] work and performance ethic since their break out."

Track listing

Personnel

Skegss
 Ben Reed – vocals, guitar, writing  
 Jonny Lani – drums 
 Toby Cregan – bass guitar 

Artwork
Cover art – Jack Irvine of Space 44

Charts

References

2015 EPs
Skegss EPs